Michael Dumanis (born January 18, 1976 in Moscow, Soviet Union) is an American poet, professor, and editor of poetry.

Works
Dumanis’s first collection of poetry, My Soviet Union (University of Massachusetts Press, 2007), won the 2006 Juniper Prize for Poetry. His second collection of poems, Creature, is being published by Four Way Books in 2023. Other works have appeared in literary journals, including American Poetry Review, The Believer, Colorado Review, The Common, Copper Nickel, Denver Quarterly, H.O.W. Journal, Indiana Review, Iowa Review, New England Review, Ninth Letter,  Ploughshares, Poetry, Post Road, and Prairie Schooner.

Along with poet Cate Marvin, Dumanis coedited the anthology Legitimate Dangers: American Poets of the New Century (Sarabande Books, 2006). With poet Kevin Prufer. he edited Russell Atkins: On the Life and Work of an American Master (Pleiades Press Unsung Masters Series, 2013). He also served as the Section Editor for the poetries of Bulgaria, Czech Republic, Macedonia, Russia, and Slovakia in The New European Poets, an anthology from Graywolf Press (2008).  Additionally, he acted as the editor for Cleveland State University Poetry Center's new publications from 2007, when he took over the small press’s directorship, until 2012.

Biography
Born in the Soviet Union, Dumanis came to the United States with his parents when they were granted political asylum in 1981. From 2005–2007, he taught creative writing at Nebraska Wesleyan University in Lincoln, Nebraska. From 2007 to 2012, was a professor of English at Cleveland State University and served as Director of the Cleveland State University Poetry Center, a literary small press. In 2012, he joined the literature faculty at Bennington College. In 2015, he relaunched the print literary journal Bennington Review, and serves as its editor. He is married to the poet and novelist Monica Ferrell and lives in North Bennington, Vermont.

Education
Dumanis holds a BA from Johns Hopkins University, an MFA from the Iowa Writers' Workshop, and a PhD in English & Creative Writing from the University of Houston.

Honors
In 1999, Dumanis received a fellowship from the Fulbright Commission, and has since received fellowships from Yaddo, the James Michener Foundation, the Wesleyan University Writers’ Conference, the Sewanee Writers' Conference,  the Headlands Center for the Arts, and the Civitella Ranieri Foundation in Umbertide, Italy. He was also awarded a 2012 Creative Workforce Fellowship from the Community Partnership for Arts and Culture  and a grant from the Ohio Arts Council.

References

External links
 Bennington College
 University of Massachusetts Press
 Sarabande Books
 Cleveland State University Poetry Center
 NEOMFA Program

Cleveland State University faculty
Iowa Writers' Workshop alumni
American male poets
1976 births
Living people
Johns Hopkins University alumni
University of Houston alumni
21st-century American poets
21st-century American male writers
Bennington College faculty
Writers from Moscow
Soviet emigrants to the United States